Graham Barnfield (born 5 November 1969 in Leicester) is a British academic and pundit associated with the hard left Revolutionary Communist Party (1981–1997).

In 1993 he began writing on cultural politics in the United States under President Franklin D. Roosevelt. Barnfield also comments on documentary representation, leading to some radio and television appearances discussing reality television and happy slapping. He teaches journalism at the University of East London.

He is the former editor of Culture Matters: Communications, Media & Communities (Sheffield Hallam University Press) and was a 2003 Fellow of the Wolfsonian-FIU. 
 
He received a BA (Hons) in English with media studies, from the University of Sussex in 1992, and a PhD in cultural studies with the dissertation Co-opting Culture: State Intervention in and Party Patronage of Literary and Popular Culture, 1929–1941, from Sheffield Hallam University in 1996.

As a teenager, he was a vocalist in Leicester rock band the Marmite Sisters. He briefly developed a sideline as a bit-part actor, including a feature credit in Number One Longing, Number Two Regret and now writes for a wide range of publications.

Partial filmography

Film

Television

Marmite Sisters

The Marmite Sisters were an indie band formed in 1984 from Glenfield, Leicestershire, England. They were initially known as the Anonymouse, with Barnfield on vocals, Steve Hill on guitar, Christopher Murphy on bass and Stub Robinson on drums.

The band's name changed to the Marmite Sisters in May 1986, undergoing multiple changes of line-up and personnel. The band's first release was the Kick Donkey cassette in 1988. This was followed by the Songs of Love and Lawnmowers cassette in 1989. The final line-up split up in 1994.

The band subsequently released the EP Gricers on a German label in February 1995 and made compilation appearances on Grapefruit Sunrise along with connected bands The Minogues and Cavalier Approach.

Discography
Belper (FLX)  
on Tea Records

Tug EP (FLX) 1991 
on Tea Records

Gricers (7" MEL 16) 1995
on Meller Welle Produckte

Featured on compilations
C92 (K7) 1993 
on Rainbow recordings  
– My White Amp

A Taste of Tea 1993
on Tea Records
– Cheapday Returns; Rain

References

External links
Graham Barnfield's weblog

English bloggers
People from Leicester
Academics of the University of East London
1969 births
Living people
Alumni of Sheffield Hallam University
Alumni of the University of Sussex
British political writers
British communists
Musicians from Leicestershire
British social commentators
People from Glenfield, Leicestershire
British male bloggers
Revolutionary Communist Party (UK, 1978) members